was a "commissioner" or an "overseer"  of the Tokugawa shogunate in Edo period Japan.  Appointments to this prominent office were always fudai daimyōs, the lowest-ranking of the shogunate offices to be so restricted. Conventional interpretations have construed these Japanese titles as "commissioner" or "overseer".

This bakufu title identifies an official with responsibility for supervision of shrines and temples. This was considered a high-ranking office, in status ranked only slightly below that of wakadoshiyori but above all other bugyō.

List of jisha-bugyō

 Tsuda Masatoshi (?-1650)
 Ōoka Tadasuke (1736–1751) 
 Kuze Hirochika (1843–1848)
 Naitō Nobuchika (1844–1848)
 Matsudaira Tadakata (1845)
 Matsudaira Nobuatsu (1848–1885)
 Andō Nobumasa (1852–1858)
 Itakura Katsukiyo (1857–1859, 1861–1862)
 Honjō Munehide (1858–1861)
 Mizuno Tadakiyo (1858–1861)
 Inoue Masanao (1861–1862)
 Makino Tadayuki (1862)
 Matsudaira Yasunao (1865)

See also
 Bugyō

Notes

References
 Beasley, William G. (1955).  Select Documents on Japanese Foreign Policy, 1853–1868. London: Oxford University Press. [reprinted by RoutledgeCurzon, London, 2001.   (cloth)]
 Dunning, Eric and  Dominic Malcolm. (2003).  Sport: Critical Concepts in Sociology. London: Taylor & Francis.  
 Nussbaum, Louis-Frédéric and Käthe Roth. (2005).  Japan encyclopedia. Cambridge: Harvard University Press. ;  OCLC 58053128

Government of feudal Japan
Officials of the Tokugawa shogunate
Religious policy in Japan
Buddhism in the Edo period